Anthony Alessandrini, better known by his stage name Tony Aless (August 28, 1921 – January 11, 1988) was an American jazz pianist.

Career
Aless worked with Bunny Berigan late in the 1930s and with Johnny McGhee, Teddy Powell, and Vaughn Monroe early in the 1940s. 
He served in the United States Army during World War II, then played with Charlie Spivak and Woody Herman. Subsequently he worked with George Auld, Flip Phillips, Chubby Jackson, Neal Hefti, Stan Getz, Elliot Lawrence, Seldon Powell, and Charlie Parker. He also worked frequently on radio and television. His 1955 Roost Records release Long Island Suite featured J.J. Johnson and Kai Winding on trombone and Dave Schildkraut on saxophone.

Discography
With Stan Getz
Stan Getz Quartets (Prestige, 1949-50 [1955])
With Charlie Parker
Big Band (Clef, 1954)
With Jack Sterling Quintet
Cocktail Swing (Harmony-Columbia, 1959)

References

External links
[ Tony Aless] at Allmusic

1921 births
1988 deaths
American jazz pianists
American male pianists
Musicians from New Jersey
People from Garfield, New Jersey
20th-century American pianists
20th-century American male musicians
American male jazz musicians
United States Army personnel of World War II